This is a list of invasive plant species in South Africa.

Species 
 Acacia baileyana
 Acacia cyclops
 Acacia dealbata
 Acacia implexa
 Acacia longifolia
 Acacia mearnsii
 Acacia pycnantha
 Acacia saligna
 Agave
 Agave americana
 Anredera cordifolia
 Araujia sericifera
 Argemone mexicana
 Caesalpinia decapetala
 Cardiospermum halicacabum
 Carduus nutans
 Castor oil plant
 Chromolaena odorata
 Commelina
 Commelina benghalensis
 Echium plantagineum
 Eichhornia crassipes
 Eucalyptus camaldulensis
 Eucalyptus globulus
 Hakea sericea
 Ipomoea
 Ipomoea alba
 Ipomoea indica
 Ipomoea purpurea
 Lantana camara
 Nephrolepis exaltata
 Nerium
 Opuntia
 Pereskia aculeata
 Pine
 Pinus halepensis
 Pinus patula
 Pinus pinaster
 Pittosporum undulatum
 Populus alba
 Salix × fragilis
 Salvinia molesta
 Sisal
 Solanum mauritianum
 Spartium
 Stone pine
 Tradescantia fluminensis

References

 
.List, invasive
Invasive plants
Invasive plants
South Africa01